Four referendums were held in Switzerland in 1961. The first two were held on 5 March on an amendment to the constitution regarding oil pipelines and a fuel tax to fund national roads. The constitutional amendment was approved, but the fuel tax rejected. The third referendum was held on 22 October on a popular initiative on using popular initiatives for federal-level laws, and was rejected by voters. The fourth referendum was on a federal resolution on the clock industry, and was approved by two-thirds of voters.

Results

March: Constitutional amendment

March: Fuel tax

October: Popular initiative

December: Clock industry

References

1961 referendums
1961 in Switzerland
Referendums in Switzerland